BSA cars were manufactured between 1907 and 1912 in Birmingham then until 1939 in Coventry as well as Birmingham, England. BSA had established a motor-car department in an unsuccessful effort to make use of the Sparkbrook Birmingham factory. An independent part of the same site was occupied by The Lanchester Motor Company Limited. Sales were handled by BSA Cycles Limited. After 1912, manufacture was carried out by group subsidiary Daimler in Coventry or BSA Cycles in Birmingham.

History

The first prototype car was produced in 1907. The following year, marketed under BSA Cycles Ltd, the company sold 150 automobiles and again began producing complete bicycles on its own account. By 1909, it was clear that the new motorcar department was unsuccessful, an investigation committee reporting to the BSA Board on the many failures of its management and their poor organization of production.

Daimler
Dudley Docker had joined the board in 1906 and was appointed deputy chairman of BSA in 1909. He had made a spectacular financial success of a merger of five large rolling-stock companies in 1902 and become the leader of the period's merger movement. Believing he could buy the missing management skills that could not be found within BSA, he started merger talks with The Daimler Company Limited of Coventry. Daimler and Rover were then the largest British car producers. Daimler was immensely profitable. After its capital reconstruction in 1904, Daimler's profits were 57% and 150% returns on invested capital in 1905 and 1906. The attraction for Daimler shareholders, was the apparent stability of BSA. So, in 1910, BSA purchased Daimler with BSA shares, but Docker, who negotiated the arrangements, either ignored or failed in his assessment of their consequences for the new combine. The combine was never adequately balanced or co-ordinated.

Docker retired as a BSA director in 1912 and installed Lincoln Chandler on the BSA board as his replacement. Docker liked to draw a comparison between the BSA~Daimler merger he engineered and that of his 1902 merger of Metropolitan Carriage Wagon & Finance Company and Patent Shaft. However, there was not the integration of facilities in the BSA~Daimler case, nor was there a reorganisation of either BSA or Daimler. In view of the earlier criticism contained in the 1909 report of the investigation committee, BSA continued to produce cars of their own, using Daimler engines. In 1913, Daimler employed 5,000 workers to manufacture 1,000 vehicles, an indication that things were not well.

Inter-war years
As well as the Daimler car range, BSA Cycles Ltd re-entered the car market under the BSA name in 1921, with a V-twin engined ten h.p. light car, followed by four-cylinder eleven h.p. and fourteen h.p. and six-cylinder twelve h.p. and sixteen h.p. models up to 1926, when the name was temporarily dropped. In 1929, a new range of 3- and 4-wheel cars appeared and production of these continued until 1936.

By 1930, the BSA Group's primary activities were BSA motorcycles and Daimler vehicles.

Car production under the BSA name ceased in 1940, with the advent of the war.

China's BSA brand ownership
BSA brand ownership was disputed after Tata Motors purchased Jaguar Cars and Daimler Company. A legal challenge halted the creation of a Chinese BSA-badged car but the case only applied to cars, not other products, such as bikes.The brand for motorbikes was eventually bought by Mahindra. However the car brand remained with the Rover group, with the Lanchester company which was purchased by the BSA Group at the end of 1930. BSA, Daimler and Lanchester became part of Jaguar Cars in 1960.

Timeline

1907 to 1914 various forms with capacities ranging from 2.5 to 4.2 litre, starting in 1907 with 18/23. The larger cars were based on the 1907 Peking-Paris Itala.
 1908 Three models: 14/18, 18/23, 25/33 all with four-cylinder engines
 1910 additional 15/20 and 20/25 models—re-badged Daimlers
second attempt
1910 (October) BSA group purchased with BSA group shares the Daimler business which would take over car manufacture.
1911 25/33 BSA car with Daimler engine, whole range is now 15/20, 20/25 and 25/33
1912 Car production transferred to Coventry, range reduced to one model, 13.9 h.p. 2015 cc also (briefly) sold by Siddeley-Deasy with a different radiator shell as Stoneleigh. This car combined semi-elliptic front suspension with transverse rear springing. The bodies built at Sparkbrook were among the first all-metal bodywork. Engines gearboxes and back axles were supplied for other Siddeley-Deasy cars.
1914 War stopped car production
1921 BSA car production resumed with rear-wheel-drive air-cooled 1080 cc V-twin Ten h.p. light car.
third attempt
1929 First BSA three-wheeler
1931 TW-5 van version of the three-wheeler
1931 The Birmingham Small Arms Company Limited acquired Lanchester and transferred production to Daimler in Coventry
fourth attempt
 1932 September, directors announce BSA Cycles' fourth attempt to enter the car trade with a 10 hp 4-seater with Daimler fluid flywheel and self-changing transmission to be produced early in the new year. Another car to be placed on the market was a four-cylinder three-wheeler with an engine identical in essential details with that of the open four-seater four-wheeler car.
1932 T-9 open four seat four-wheeler with a water-cooled four cylinder 9 hp engine (1075 cc).
1932 V-9 Van version also produced.
1932 Another BSA Rear-wheel-drive fluid flywheel 10 hp car, sold alongside the T9.
1932 FW32 Four-wheeled version of the 3-wheeler produced for 1 year
1933 T-9 and V-9 production ceased
1933 Four-cylinder engine version of the three and four-wheeled car was added to the range.
1934 Six-cylinder engine version of the Ten, Light Six 12 hp.
1935 First Scout, Series 2/3
1936 Three-wheeled cars dropped
1936 BSA versions of Lanchester cars dropped
1936 to 1937 Scout Series 4 	
1937 to 1938 Scout Series 5 	
1938 to 1939 Scout Series 6 	
1940 World War II stopped production of BSA cars
1958 to 1960 Ladybird 3-wheeler prototype

(please note some detail may not be reliable)

Models

References

External links

 BSA tourer 1909
 Ten two-seater 1040cc first registered 10 June 1925

Defunct motor vehicle manufacturers of England
Defunct companies based in Birmingham, West Midlands
BSA motorcars